Lukáš Zevl (born 25 October 1991) is a Czech badminton player. He was two times Hatzor International champions, winning the men's singles title in 2016 and the men's doubles title in 2018.

Career 
In 2014, Zevl participated at the European Men's Team Championships. At the 2012 and 2014 Czech Nationals, he won the bronze medal in the men's singles. In 2015, he finished as finalists in the Hatzor International, losing to Sam Parsons  of England in straight games.

Achievements

BWF International Challenge/Series 
Men's singles

Men's doubles

  BWF International Challenge tournament
  BWF International Series tournament
  BWF Future Series tournament

References

External links 
 

1991 births
Living people
Sportspeople from České Budějovice
Czech male badminton players